Walter Eustace Rhodes (1872 – 13 July 1918) was an English historian, translator, librarian and soldier.

Rhodes was the son of John and Ellen Rhodes, of Cheetham, Manchester. From 1895 until his resignation in 1903 he was the librarian of Owens College Library.

During the First World War he served as a private in the Devonshire Regiment. He was killed on 13 July 1918 and is memorialised on the war memorial of the University of Manchester.

Works
Rhodes made several contributions to the Dictionary of National Biography. He also had material published by the Chetham Society
 The Apostolical Life of Ambrose Barlow, (ed.) (1909) Manchester: Chetham Society
 Chetham miscellanies, (1909) Manchester: Chetham Society
Also:
 "The Italian bankers in England and their loans to Edward I and Edward II" in Historical essays by members of the Owens college, Manchester (1901) p. 137-168

References

1872 births
1918 deaths
English historians
Devonshire Regiment soldiers
British Army personnel of World War I
British military personnel killed in World War I